Sa-Ngor-Chotshog Centre is a Buddhist monastery in Sikkim, northeastern India. It is the only monastery in Sikkim that belongs to the Sakyapa sect of Buddhism. It was founded in 1961.

References

Buddhist monasteries in Sikkim
Sakya monasteries and temples